West Germany (Federal Republic of Germany) competed at the Winter Olympic Games for the last time as a separate nation at the 1988 Winter Olympics in Calgary, Alberta, Canada.  Following German reunification in 1990, a single German team would compete in the 1992 Winter Olympics.

Medalists

Competitors
The following is the list of number of competitors in the Games.

Alpine skiing

Men

Men's combined

Women

Women's combined

Biathlon

Men

Men's 4 x 7.5 km relay

1A penalty loop of 150 metres had to be skied per missed target. 
2One minute added per missed target.

Bobsleigh

Cross-country skiing

Men

C = Classical style, F = Freestyle

Men's 4 × 10 km relay

Women

C = Classical style, F = Freestyle

Women's 4 × 5 km relay

Figure skating

Men

Women

Pairs

Ice Dancing

Ice hockey

Group B
Top three teams (shaded ones) entered the medal round.

 West Germany 2-1 Czechoslovakia
 West Germany 7-3 Norway
 Austria 1-3 West Germany
 West Germany 3-6 Soviet Union
 West Germany 4-1 USA

Final round
The top three teams from each group play the top three teams from the other group once. Points from previous games against their own group carry over.

 Finland 8-0 West Germany
 Canada 8-1 West Germany
 Sweden 3-2 West Germany

Leading scorers

Team roster
Ron Fischer
Udo Kiessling
Horst-Peter Kretschmer
Dieter Medicus
Andreas Niederberger
Harold Kreis
Manfred Schuster
Manfred Wolf
Christian Brittig
Peter Draisaitl
Georg Franz
Dieter Hegen
Georg Holzmann
Peter Obresa
Roy Roedger
Peter Schiller
Helmut Steiger
Gerd Truntschka
Bernd Truntschka
Joachim Reil
Helmut de Raaf
Josef Schlickenrieder
Karl Friesen
Head coach: Xaver Unsinn

Luge

Men

(Men's) Doubles

Women

Nordic combined 

Men's individual

Events:
 normal hill ski jumping (Best two out of three jumps.)
 15 km cross-country skiing (Start delay, based on ski jumping results.)

Men's Team

Three participants per team.

Events:
 normal hill ski jumping (Three jumps per team member per round, best two rounds counted.)
 10 km cross-country skiing (Start delay, based on ski jumping results.)

Ski jumping 

Men's team large hill

1Four teams members performed two jumps each. The best three were counted.

Speed skating

Men

Women

References

Official Olympic Reports
International Olympic Committee results database
 1988 Olympic Winter Games 1988, full results by sports-reference.com

Germany, West
1988
Winter Olympics